Graeme Reginald Page (born 14 February 1943) is a former Australian politician. He was born in Launceston, Tasmania. In 1976, he was elected to the Tasmanian House of Assembly representing Wilmot for the Liberal Party. He was Speaker of the House from 1992 to 1996. Page was defeated in 1996.

References

1943 births
Living people
Liberal Party of Australia members of the Parliament of Tasmania
Members of the Tasmanian House of Assembly
Speakers of the Tasmanian House of Assembly